Claude Desailly (1922–2009) was a French screenwriter. He collaborated on a number of films with the director Robert Hossein. He is best known for his creation and writing of the period crime television series Les Brigades du Tigre which ran from 1974 to 1983.

Selected filmography

Film
 Mandrin (1962)
 Les Yeux cernés (1964)
 The Vampire of Düsseldorf (1965)
 I Killed Rasputin (1967)
 Cemetery Without Crosses (1969)
 Point de chute (1970)

Television
 Les Brigades du Tigre (1974-1983)
 Mathias Sandorf (1979)

References

Bibliography
 Christian Bosseno. Télévision française La saison 2010: Une analyse des programmes du 1er septembre 2008 au 31 août 2009. Editions L'Harmattan,  2010.

External links

1922 births
2009 deaths
French screenwriters
People from Cambrai
20th-century French screenwriters